WJXF-LP, UHF analog channel 49, was a low-powered television station licensed to Jackson, Mississippi, United States. The station was owned by Equity Broadcasting.

History

WJXF began carrying LAT TV programming beginning May 30, 2007, as part of a new deal between LAT TV and Equity. It was originally announced that LAT TV would replace Univision on sister station WJMF-LP. However, WJMF kept the Univision affiliation while WJXF began broadcasting LAT TV programming.  Until that date, WJXF was a repeater of non-Equity WBXK-CA.

In December 2007, WJXF switched from LAT TV to Retro Jams, an Equity service that presents music videos, plus infomercials overnight.

WJXF was sold at auction to Rainey Radio on April 16, 2009.  The sale closed on July 10, 2009.

In October 2010, Rainey Radio filed a Request for Silent STA with the Federal Communications Commission, citing technical and financial problems. The station's license would be cancelled in October 2011.

References

Equity Media Holdings
JXF-LP
Television channels and stations disestablished in 2010
Defunct television stations in the United States
Television channels and stations established in 2001
2001 establishments in Mississippi
2010 establishments in Mississippi
JXF-LP